Sindhi literature, is the composition of oral and written scripts and texts in the Sindhi language in the form of prose: (romantic tales, and epic stores) and poetry: (Ghazal, Wai and Nazm). The Sindhi language of the province of Sindh in Pakistan is considered to be the one of the oldest languages of Ancient India, due to the influence on the language of Indus Valley inhabitants. Sindhi literature has developed over a thousand years. 

According to the historians, Nabi Bux Baloch, Rasool Bux Palijo, and GM Syed, Sindhi had a great influence on the Hindi language in pre-Islamic times. Nevertheless, after the advent of Islam in eighth century, Arabic language and Persian language influenced the inhabitants of the area and were the official language of territory through different periods.

Shah Abdul Latif Bhittai, Shah Abdul Karim Bulri, Shaikh Ayaz and Ustad Bukhari are important poets writing in Sindhi.

History

Early Period  (712-1030) 
Before Arabs, local Hindu Rajas ruled Sindh. Following invasion in 712, Arabs conquered Sindh and took over government of the area. They did not speak Sindhi, but in spite of this, Sindhi writers and poets played a role in the development of the Sindhi and Arabic languages. This period is usually known as the early period of Sindhi literature.

Developments
 Qur'an was translated into Sindhi language.
 All previous books which were written in Sindhi were translated into Arabic.
 In this period Sindhi ode (Qasida) founded.
 Many books were written in Sindhi and taught into religious seminaries.
 The earliest book about Sindh history Chach Nama was written in this period.

Soomra Period (1030-1350) 

When Arabs rule declined in Sindh, Sindhi-speaking inhabitants defeated the Arabs and became rulers of Sindh. This period is known as the classical period of Sindhi literature, although Persian remained the official language and Arabic remained as a religious language. The Soomra dynasty ruled over Sindh nearly two centuries. In that period, the Sindhi language expanded and new literary ideas were expressed in Gech (گيچ) and Gahi (ڳاھ).

This period was a period of prosperity and development for the Sindhi dialect.  During this period, Sindhi language was also used as a source for Islamic preaching.  Apart from this, natural Sindhi poetry also started to set evolutionary goals.  Apart from the Arabic books, there is also evidence from which it is known that at that time Sindhi was a satirical language and there was literature on it. In the 19th century AD, a traveling scholar by the name of Acharya Adyutan came to Sindh from the court of Saurashtra to study Sindh and Sindhi language. In 778 A.D., Muni wrote the book "Kawab Malha Kaha" on the basis of his study. But he writes about Sindhi poetry: "We are those Sindhi poets who had a taste for melodious songs. They sang their song in a very melodious manner with Minaj's delicacy." On the basis of this statement, Baktar Jiramdas wrote:

Sindhi language was made as a source for Islamic preaching. Apart from this, natural Sindhi poetry also started to set evolutionary goals. In the Arabic books, there is also this unprovenness. From what I know, at that time there was a satirical language and there was literature on it.  In the 19th century AD, a traveling scholar "Acharya Adyutan" came to Sindh from the court of Saurashtra to study Sindh and Sindhi language. He died in 778 AD and wrote the book "Kawab Malha Kaha" on the basis of his study. But he writes about Sindhi poetry: "We are those Sindhi poets who had a taste for melodious songs. They sang their song in a very melodious manner with the delicacy of Minaj and Dar.

Epic stories from Soomra period
 Dodo Chaniser
 Morero Meharbar
 Jam Hali and Hameer Soomro war
 Soomra and Gujar wars

Samma Period (1350-1520)

Samma were allied of Soomra, but with the passage of time, the final Soomra ruler Hameer was defeated by Samma ruler Jam Unar. And they became the Ruler of Thatta. Even though this period is considered the constructive period of sindhi literature, in this period Persian remained official language and Arabic as a religious language, this period resembled to Soomra but language's vocabulary enhanced as well as power of expression.the borders of Sindh reached Multan, Bhawalwapur, Pasni, Khatiyawar, Makran, Sibi, Kuch, Kalat too. Thatta became the center of knowledge and more than 5000 religious seminaries present in Thatta.

Mughal, Argon and Turkhan Period (1521-1718)

Shah Beg Arghun's father, Amir Zulnun Arghun, was the ruler of Qandar on behalf of Mirza Shah Hussain Baiqra.  In 1507, after the murder of Yar Zul-Nun, his son Shah Beg Arghun, Shah Ismail Muhammad Khan Shibani-e-Babur, took control of Shal-e-Sabi, Kabul, Kandar-Chidi, Balochistan.  Due to the weakness of Jam Firoz, Jam Salahuddin rebelled, which led to a civil war between Malik.  Shah Beg Arghun did attack on Sindh and conquered it in 1521.  After that, Suji took possession of the document.  In this way, their rule over Sindh ended and the slavery of the Sinddars was arrested.

Shah Beg Arghun died on 22 Shaban 928 AH (1522 AD) and Hakim Theo who conquered the Saju region up to Multan in 1526 AD.  On his day, Humayun Sher Shah defeated Suri and died in 1541 from Lahore and Ach.  In OmarKot  Akbar was born.  Shah Hasan Arghun case after him his letter Shah Hassan Arghun document.  Document came.  document

Mah Rahat died and went to Iran on 10 July 1543.  In 1554, Shah Hassan Arghun died.  Because of this, Sindh was divided into two families.  The northern part of Sindh came under the control of Sultan Mahmud Bakri, who was the governor of Bakr during the reign of Shah Hasan Arghun

he  When Amir Mirza Isa Tarkhan took control of Henahin Sanad, the Tarkhan government was established.  1000 AH (1991 AD) Mirza Abdul Rahim Khan Khanan conquered Sind on behalf of Murakbar.  Ghazi Beg was appointed Nawab of Nani.  After that, Sindh became a part of the Mughal empire. During the days of the Mughals, separate subedars were appointed at Yernani, Bakr and Siwat.  During the time of Muhammad Shah, the Mughal power weakened.  In Sind, the Kalhojas became stronger, and at the end of the Sunnah, the Kalhoras went under occupation and established their own government.  After that, the governor's visit stopped. 

During that period, there was anarchy and peace and order was destroyed.  Because of this loss, the knowledge and literature of Sindh, which passed peacefully, were destroyed, and the scholars and scholars of Sindh migrated to Arabia and Gujarat.  During these days, there was chaos in Central Asia, which led to the emigration of the intellectual family to Sindh.  After them, the church of knowledge was established as a seminary.  The mother tongue of the Arghuns was Persian, which under the patronage of the Persian language and Persian, but the poetry became a common practice, and many high-level Persian poets were born, Jharuk: Maulana Mir Yusuf Ghauri, Ghauri, Kalej Haider Mir Masoom Bakri, Mirza.  Ghazi Beg Talib Amli and Amir Abul Karam Natvi and others.  There was also a tradition of Urdu poetry based on Sindh.  Many Mughal Sindhi poets wrote poems in Urdu: Sheikh Waru Abdul Subhan, Faiz Natwi, Syed Hyderuddin Kamil, etc.  At that time?  |  The histories of the Farsiyya era were also written, Jazhuk: Mir Masoom "Hadiq Bakri's Tarikh Mamoomi" 1600 AD, Sayyid Abdul Qadir Tanuyya's Tahir Muhammad Al-Awlia' "Editor Beglari's "Beglarnama" 1608 AD.  Mir Nasiani's "Tarikh Tahiri, Mir Yusuf's "Mozhar Shahjahani" 1634] Sayed Jamaluddin's "Tarkhan Nama" in 1654.

After the downfall of Samma dynasty, the three noble families ruled Sindh approximately 2 centuries, in which the prominent Sindhi poet Shah Abdul Karim Bulri, the four-father of Shah Abdul Latif Bhittai, was born. He made notable contributions to sindhi poetry and made it in a new form in the shape of ‘‘Bait and Wai’’.

Kalhora Period (1718-1782)

In the time of Mughal Empire in subcontinent, Kalhora’s became strong and were close assistant to the rulers of Mughal’s. After a period, Yar Muhammad Kalhoro made an agreement of execution of prominent poet Shah Abdul Karim Bulri and became the first ruler of Kalhora Dynasty.

While this period considered to be the golden person of Sindhi literature, due to birth of Shah Abdul Latif Bhittai and advancement in Sindhi literature. Due to the fact that the rulers were Sindhi, so the priorities their language and make it useful.

Talpur Period (1782-1843)

This is the period that we know as the early foundation of Sindhi Prose. After the invasion of Talpur’s over Kalhora, they ruled Sindh about 150 years. They didn’t train their army due to lack of literacy and awareness. The British, with their strong army, defeated them.

British Raj (1843-1947)
British conquered Sindh in 1843. After that, Sindhi language was decided to be the official language and medium of education instead of Persian.  In that period a committee of scholars called, Such as: Munshi G. Adaram Munshi Nandiram Mirza Sadiq Ali, Qazi Ghulam Ali Mian Ghulam Khat Hussain.. Mian Muhammad A. Biya for sindhi alphabet discussion. After the discussion, the Arabic custom was adopted and the Sindhi text was approved and implemented.

Apart from textbooks, poetry and prose books began to be published after the signing of the Constitution.  In 1853, Munshi Nandiram's Baratu textbook "Babnamo" was printed. After that, every year, there were many Chiba on every science and art.  And then they continued to chew on the same letter.  "King's Magazine" from the city of Lipperg. "Dewan Gul" in 1875.
1876 "Bayan Al-Arifin" and 1878 "Diwan Qasim" published the first book on criticism, Fazil Shah's "Meezan Al-Shaar" published in 1883. Among the writers of that early period, the names of these are worth mentioning:

After independence 
In 1947, Pakistan came into existence. Kaki Peru died in 1953 and Lalchand Amar Zani died in 1954. Like "Ahri", Sindhi language and literature also fell on the spot: Hik Sanad Par Beu Hind M. Writers in many places were affected by the demands of the time and Sindhi literature took a new form, now beauty and love and flowers and bubbles. The description of which decreased and economic and social topics took its place. After the Pakistan, Sindhi literature received some attention. But soon the writers began to talk about the development of the language and literature. Mahmood "Khadim" continues to be a "Writer of Sunnah" who has done great service to prose poetry.

In addition to his own editor, he published the magazine "Adeeb Sindh" but also published standard articles on folk literature, Sindhi dictionary and Sindhi culture.  By running the magazine "Khadim" every year on a large scale, Sindh literary conferences were held in some cities, which played an important role in promoting the Sindhi language and writers. 

In the same period of 1956, young writers established Sindhi Literary Society, which took the form of "Sand Sangat". For the success of the work of the Sangat, Ayaz Qadriya started the work. Many branches were established. Since then, many literary groups and publishing houses have been established from time to time, which have served their purpose.  Zindagi" and the quarterly "Mehran" except for "Ruh Rehan", "Sahti", "Goon Sadar", "Marai", "Udayun", "Latif", "Taqada", "Ruh Adab", "Our Soul", "Sarang".  ", "Shalo", "Paras Sukkur", "Sindhi Daejast", "Sindhi Sahit", "Nari", "Latif Daejast", "Sania", "Barsat" etc., served as the backbone of Sindhi language and literature. They are closed. Only "New Life", "Mehran" will come 66 out of them

In 1950, the central government launched the monthly "New Life" which provided valuable material on every genre of literature.  After that, he died.  With the efforts of M Syed and Miran Muhammad Shah, the Sindhi Literature Board came into existence, which contributed to the history and vocabulary of Sindhi literature.  In 1955, "Mehran" was published by the board, which focused on research literature. It also promoted modern literature and this magazine is still running. With the efforts of Mr. Abdul Razzaq "Raz" in 1952, a publication named "Habib Publication" was published.  An institution was established which published standard books on modern literature.

Modern era 

Modern Sindhi literature began with the region's 1843 conquest by the British, when the printing press was introduced.

Magazines and newspapers revolutionized Sindhi literature, and books were translated from a number of European languages (particularly English). People were hungry for knowledge and new forms of writing. Mirza Kalich Beg wrote more than four hundred books (including poetry, novels, short stories and essays) about science, history, economics and politics during the last two decades of the nineteenth century and the first two decades of the twentieth.  Thousands of books were published at that time, and Hakeem Fateh Mohammad Sehwani,  Kauromal Khilnani, Dayaram Gidumal, Parmanand Mewaram, Lalchand Amardinomal, Bheruamal Advani, Dr. Gurbuxani, Jethmal Parsram, Miran Mohammad Shah, Shamsuddin Bulbul and Maulana Din Muhammad Wafai were pioneers of modern Sindhi literature.

In India Sahitya Akademi Award for Sindhi literature is given annually since 1959.
After World War I, Sindhi literature was affected by the October Revolution and other socioeconomic changes. Literature became more objective and less romantic, and progressivism was an influence.

The struggle for freedom from the British gathered momentum, sparking interest in the history and cultural heritage of Sindh. Scholars such as Allama I. I. Kazi, his wife Elsa Kazi, Rasool Bux Palijo, G. M. Syed, Umer Bin Mohammad Daudpota, Pir Ali Muhammad Shah Rashidi, Pir Husamuddin Shah Rashidi, Maulana deen Muhammad Wafai, Chetan Mariwala, Jairamdas Daulatram, Hasho Kewalramani, Bherumal Meharchand Advani, Abdul Majeed Sindhi (Memon), Badaruddin Dhamraho, Muhammad Ibrahim Joyo, Allah Dad Bohyo, Tirath Wasant published works on history and culture.

Mir Hasan Ali and Mir Abdul Hussain Sangi, Khalifo Gul, Fazil Shah, Kasim, Hafiz Hamid, Mohammad Hashim, Mukhlis, Abojho, Surat Singh, Khaki, Mirza Qalich Baig, Zia and Aziz pioneered poetry in Persian meter. "Bewas" (a pseudonym), Hyder Bux Jatoi and Dukhayal are modern poets.

The novel and short story became the main prose forms, and hundreds of each were translated from European languages to the languages of Pakistan. World War II saw the emergence of novelists and short-story writers such as Narain Das Bhambhani, Gobind Malhi, Sushila J. Lalwani, Lokram Dodeja, Sundri Uttamchandani, Popati Hiranandani, Dr. Moti Prakash, Sharma, Kala Sharma, G L Dodeja, Padan Sharma, Ghulam Rabbani Agro, Usman Deplai, Jamal Abro, Shaikh Ayaz, Rasheed Bhatti, Hameed Sindhi, Hafeez Akhund, Amar Jaleel, Naseem Kharal, Sirajul Haq Memon, Agha Saleem, Anis Ansari, Tariq Ashraf, Ali Baba, Eshwar Chander, Manak, Asghar Sindhi, Adil Abbasi, Ishtiaq Ansari, Shaukat Shoro, Kehar Shaukat, Mushtaq Shoro, Madad Ali Sindhi, Rasool Memon, Akhlaq Asnari, Reta Shahani, Rehmatullah Manjothi, Aziz Kingrani Badal Jamali, Ishaque Ansari, Jan Khaskheli, Hasan Mansoor, Pervez, Shakoor Nizamani, Tariq Qureshi, Munawwar Siraj, Ismail Mangio, Fayaz Chand Kaleri, Ayaz Ali Rind, Altaf Malkani. Sindhi drama has also flourished, and Aziz Kingrani has written scores of plays.

Young writers have experimented with new forms of prose and poetry. Free verse, sonnets and ballads have been written in addition to classical poetry forms such as Kafi, Vaee, beit, Geet and Dohira.

Notable Sindh poets are Makhdoom Muhammad Zaman Talib-ul-Mola, Ustad Bukhari, Shaikh Ayaz, Darya Khan Rind, Ameen Faheem, and Imdad Hussaini. Mubarak Ali Lashari is a literary critic and the author of Kuthyas Kawejan.

Noor-ud-din Sarki and Abdul Ghafoor Ansari founded Sindhi Adabi Sangat, an organization of Sindhi-language writers originally centered in Karachi, in 1952. Chapters now exist in other parts of Pakistan and overseas.

Children's literature 
The children's novels Lakho Phulani ( and Naon Chateeha Lakhinoo were written by Shamsuddin Ursani. Gul Phul is a popular children's magazine which was edited by author Akbar Jiskani. Laat, a magazine published by Mehran Publication, was founded by Altaf Malkani and Zulfiqar Ali Bhatti (author of the spy novel Khofnaak Saazish. The Sindhi Adabi Board has published books for children. Waskaro, a magazine which began publication in 1990, contains short stories, poems and articles. The Sindhi Language Authority has also published books for children.

Literature 
The earliest references to Sindhi literature are contained in the writings of Arab historians; Sindhi was among the earliest Eastern languages into which the Quran was translated in the eighth or ninth century AD. Evidence exists that Sindhi poets recited verses before Muslim caliphs ruled in Baghdad. Secular treatises were also written in Sindhi about astronomy, medicine, and history during the eighth and ninth centuries. Pir Nooruddin, an Ismaili missionary who lived in Sindh in 1079, wrote Sufi poetry in the Sindhi language. His verses, known as ginans, are an example of early Sindhi poetry. Because Pir Nooruddin was a Sufi and an Islamic preacher, his verses are full of references to (and descriptions of) mysticism and religion.

Pir Shams Sabzwari Multani, Pir Shahabuddin and Pir Sadardin also wrote Sindhi poetry, and some verses by Baba Farid Ganj Shakar were written in Sindhi. Pir Sadruddin (1290–1409 AD) was another major Sufi Sindhi poet, composing verse in Sindhi's Lari and Katchi dialects. He also wrote in Punjabi, Seraiki, Hindi, and Gujarati. Sadruddin modified the language's old script, which was commonly used by the lohana caste of Sindh Hindus who embraced Islam as a result of his teaching; he called them Khuwajas or Khojas.

During the Samma dynasty (1351-1521), Sindh produced notable scholars and poets; the Sammas were some of the original inhabitants of Sindh. This era has been called the "original period for Sindhi poetry and prose". Mamui Faqirs' (Seven Sages) riddles in verse are associated with this period. Ishaq Ahingar (Blacksmith) was also a notable contemporary poet. Sufi scholar and poet Qazi Qadan (died 1551) composed Doha and Sortha poetry, and was a landmark in the history of Sindhi literature. Shah Abdul Karim Bulri, Shah Lutufullah Qadri, Shah Inayat Rizvi, Makhdoom Nuh of Hala, Lakho Lutufullah, and Mahamati Pirannath are among other authors of Sindhi mystic, romantic and epic poetry.

Romantic tales
 Sassui Punnhun, this romantic story goes back to the Soomra rule. Sasui was from Bhambore but Phunoo belonged to Makran. They both got married, and after that Phunoo took him back then Sasui came out in the search of Phunoo. Many Sindhi poets narrated this story, particularly Shah Abdul Latif Bhittai.
 Umar Marvi is the second famous Romantic story of that period which was widely sung by Sindhi language poets. Umar was the Soomra ruler of Umarkot he fell in love with Marvi, he picked up her and then captivated her in the palace of Umarkot, where he impressed from Marvi affection towards her native people, finally he got her free.
 Momal Rano: this story is about the Soomra ruler Hameer. Rano was the son-in-law of Hameer and fell in love with a Gujrati girl.
 Sohni Mehar:  this is the fourth romantic story of this period.
 Lilan Chanesar: this story is also from the Soomra period .
 Sorath Rai Diyach: another story from the Soomra period. 
 Noori Jam Tamachi: this is semi-romantic and from the time when the Soommra government was in Lar.

Epic poetry
When Soommra and Gujar fought from 1150-1250, many poets composed Gah over that battles. Dodo and Chanesar war was another chapter which was composed by Sindhi poets.

Religious poetry
In the Soomra time when different Islamic sect missionary arrived in Sindh to preach the Islam in the wake first Suharwardi, Qadari then Isailmi Shia Leaders started preaching in Sindh. Most popular Isailmi sect Ginan poetry played pivotal role in Sindhi literature, first of all in 1079, Syed Noor Deen Ismaili Imam arrived in Sindh, he used to preach in Local language, then Shamas Sabzwari Multani came n Sindh his Ginan too present in Sindhi language, But most popular Ginan belongs to Pir Shahab u deen and his son Pir Sadar u Deen (1290-1409), they set up 40 letters Sindhi language alphabet, which was called Khawajqi Sindhi, Ginan was religious poetry, in which morals lesson were taught,

Literature Technics
 Gahi (ڳاھِ), This is the early form of Sindhi beet . Gahi is type evental and descriptive beet. this word derived from Gahe (ڳاءِ). 
 Epic poetry, (Razmia poetry) this type of poetry represents the battle and its history, warriors and their memory.
 Romantic poetry, another type of Sindhi language poetry in which romance love stories have been represented.
 Semi-romantic poetry, like romantic poetry.
 Ginan, religious poetry first propagandized by Ismailis Shia religious missionary, and this developed and gave shape to Beet.
 Madih (مدح), a type of poetry in which religious personalities goodness mentioned. The first Madih poet of Sindhi language was Juman Charan.
 Religious poetry, in this poetry Islamic principles are mentioned and composed by various Sindhi poets.
 Geech (ڳيچ)
 Evental verses (واقعاتي بيت)

Kalhora and Talpur dynasties 
Shah Abdul Latif Bhittai (1689–1752) lived during the Kalhora dynasty, a significant period in the history of Sindhi literature. The Sindhi language was standardized at this time, and classical Sindhi poetry flourished with Shah Latif's work. Shah Latif invented a variant of the tanbur, a musical instrument played when poetry is sung. His compilation, Shah Jo Risalo, includes "Sassi Punnun" and "Umar Marvi".

Shah Latif traveled to remote regions of Sindh, studying its people and their attachment to its land, culture, music, art and crafts. He described Sindh and its people in folk tales, expressing ideas about the universal brotherhood of mankind, patriotism, the struggle against injustice and tyranny, and the beauty of human existence. Also a musician, Shah Latif composed fifteen svaras (melodies). Each line of his poetry is sung on a specific svara. Khawaja Muhammad Zaman of Luari, whose poetry appears in Abdul Rahim Garhori's Shara Abyat Sindhi, was another notable Kalhora Sufi poet.

Sachal Sarmast, Sami and Khalifo Nabi Bux Laghari were celebrated poets of the Talpur period (1783–1843). Khalifo Nabi Bux was an epic poet known for his depictions of patriotism and the art of war. Rohal, Bedil, Bekas, Syed Misri Shah, Hammal Faqir, Sufi Dalpat, Syed Sabit Ali Shah, Khair Shah, Fateh Faqir and Manthar Faqir Rajar were other noteworthy poets of the pre- and early British era.

See also 
Sindhology
Sindhis
List of Sindhi-language poets
Noori Jam Tamachi
Pakistani literature
Doha (Indian literature)
Parween Musa Memon

Further reading

 Sindhi Sahitya Charitre - Kannaḍa language translation by Sumatheendra Nadig of History of Sindhi Literature by L. H. Ajwani. Sahitya Akademi, Rabindra Bhavan, New Delhi 110001 (1981).
 "Indo-Persian Literature in Sindh" in The Rise, Growth And Decline of Indo-Persian Literature by R. M. Chopra, Iran Culture House, New Delhi (2012).
 “Sindhi Adab Jo Mukhtasir Jaizo” by Akbar Lighari, Roshni publication, Karachi (2018).

References

External links
The Largest Sindhi Adbi website in Sindhi language
Sindhi literature magazine of Sindh - Sindhiana
Shah Jo Risalo - The Selection, translated into English by: Elsa Kazi
Sindhi Sangat - promoting and preserving the Sindhi heritage, culture and language. 

 
Literature by language
Literature by ethnicity
Pakistani literature
Pakistani literature by language
Indian literature by language